Andrew Blunt is a Missouri political consultant and founder of state-based consulting firm Statehouse Strategies LLC. He is the son of Missouri Senator Roy Blunt and the brother of former Missouri Governor Matt Blunt. The Missouri Times named Andy Blunt one of the 100+ people to know in Missouri politics for the previous four years, stating, “If this list was the 5+ [people to know], Andy Blunt would still be on it.” Blunt's extensive client list has been credited by some to his diverse range of experiences and relationships at the Missouri state capital, while others assert that his clients are attracted to the influence he has on his father. Blunt is a state lobbyist and does not lobby the federal government.

Early life and education 

Born in Springfield, Missouri, Andy moved to Jefferson City with the rest of the Blunt family when his father, Roy Blunt, was elected as Missouri Secretary of State. When Andy was in college, his father Roy Blunt ran for the United States Congress. Andy traveled with his father's campaign and built a strong interest in politics. Andy finished college a semester early and began to work for Missouri consultant David Barklage. Andy holds a Juris Doctor degree from the University of Missouri in Columbia, Missouri. He received a Bachelor of Science degree from Southwest Baptist University in Bolivar, Missouri. Andy and his wife Jill have two children, Benjamin and Allyson.

Professional life

Lawyer and lobbyist
In 2000, Andy Blunt began his career as a political strategist, leading his brother Matt's successful bid for Secretary of State of Missouri.  In 2002, Blunt became a founding partner of law firm Schreimann, Rackers, Francka & Blunt, LLC. In 2014 Blunt was paid $135,000 to represent an unaccredited and bankrupt educational enterprise, the Normandy School District, so as to lobby the Missouri state legislature for a bailout.  In 2016 Blunt began Statehouse Strategies LCC, a lobbying firm which focuses on the Missouri General Assembly. In 2018, Statehouse Strategies and Cloakroom Advisors, LCC announced a joint venture, Husch Blackwell Strategies, LLC, a national government relations firm headquartered in Jefferson City, Missouri.  Blunt is the Chairman of the Board and Chief Operating Officer for Husch Blackwell Strategies.

Campaign manager
In 2004 Blunt managed his brother's successful campaign for governor in 2004. In 2010 Blunt managed his father's campaign for U.S. Senate, in which Roy Blunt defeated then-Secretary of State Robin Carnahan by 14 points.  The campaign carried 112 of Missouri's 114 counties, leading Senator Blunt to a winning margin of 14 percent, the largest midterm win in a Missouri Senate race since 1994.  Politico called it one of the Top 10 campaigns in the country in 2010. Andy Blunt managed his father's successful campaign for re-election to the United States Senate in 2016. Opponents questioned whether Blunt's simultaneous lobbying and campaign management was a conflict of interest, a charge with Blunt denied.

FEC inquiry
In 2016, the Federal Elections Commission has asked questions pertaining to Blunt's management of two Political Action Committees that contributed to his father's 2016 Senate re-election campaign. The FEC dismissed those assertions finding no wrongdoing.

References

Living people
American political consultants
People from Springfield, Missouri
Year of birth missing (living people)
People from Jefferson City, Missouri
University of Missouri alumni
Blunt family